"Charmer" is a song by English hip hop trio N-Dubz. The song was written by the trio, Junior Edwards, and its producer Rymez. On 19 May 2022, "Charmer" premiered on BBC Radio 1Xtra and was released to streaming services through Xploded Music. It is N-Dubz's first single following an 11-year hiatus.

Background and release
On 16 May 2022, a 40-second teaser trailer was shared on N-Dubz's social media showing the trio flying in a helicopter over London; as they emerge after landing, a snippet of "Charmer" is played.

Composition
"Charmer" combines Afrobeats with modern UK rap through use of Auto-Tune-heavy melodies and "breezy" production.

Charts

References

2022 singles
2022 songs
N-Dubz songs
Songs written by Dappy 
Songs written by Richard Rawson
Songs written by Tulisa (singer)